Screenplaying is a compilation album by British singer-songwriter and guitarist Mark Knopfler, released on 9 November 1993 by Vertigo Records internationally and Warner Bros. Records in the United States. The album contains previously released tracks from Knopfler's soundtrack albums Cal (1984), Last Exit to Brooklyn (1989), The Princess Bride (1987), and Local Hero (1983).

Critical reception

In his review for AllMusic, William Ruhlmann gave the album four and a half out of five stars, writing, "The music is reminiscent of the calmer parts of Dire Straits songs: melodic, lyrical, and touching."

Track listing
All music was written by Mark Knopfler, except where indicated.

Charts

Certifications

References

External links
 Screenplaying at Mark Knopfler official website
 
 
 
 

1993 compilation albums
Albums produced by Mark Knopfler
Mark Knopfler albums
Soundtrack compilation albums
Vertigo Records compilation albums
Warner Records compilation albums